Császártöltés is a  village in Bács-Kiskun county, in the Southern Great Plain region of southern Hungary.

Croats in Hungary call this village Tetiš or Tuotiš.
Germans in Hungary call this village Tschasartet or Kaiserdamm.

Geography

References 

Populated places in Bács-Kiskun County
Hungarian German communities